is a Japanese outsider artist who lives in Kanagawa Prefecture, Japan. He is often referred to as  due to his habit of riding his bicycle around the streets of Yokohama wearing eccentric clothing and large, elaborate hats or headgear adorned with dolls and other recycled objects.

Exhibitions
 "快走老人録－老いてますます過激になる－" at Borderless Art Museum No-Ma in Ōmihachiman, Shiga (16 September – 15 November 2006)
 Collection de l'art brut in Lausanne, Switzerland (22 February – 28 September 2008)
 Art Brut from Japan in Vienna, Austria (16 July – 18 October 2009)

References

External links
 Artist profile on "Collection de l'Art Brut" 
 Artist profile on "Spirit Art Museum" 

Living people
1934 births
Japanese artists